Fastech 360 is the name given to a pair of former experimental high-speed EMU trainsets developed by East Japan Railway Company (JR East) to test technology for the next-generation Shinkansen rolling stock. The name is a portmanteau of Fast, Technology, and 360 km/h, the target operational speed for production trains based on the new technologies.

There were 2 trains:
Class E954 Fastech 360S: 8-car set for use on shinkansen tracks only
Class E955 Fastech 360Z: 6-car set for use on both shinkansen and Mini-shinkansen lines

Fastech 360 trains were equipped with emergency air braking plates like that of an aircraft, similar in appearance to the ears of a cat. This technology was not incorporated in the subsequent E5 series or E6 series trains.

Class E954 Fastech 360S

This 8-car set (S9) was delivered on 26 June 2005. Cars 1 to 3 were built by Hitachi, and cars 4 to 8 were built by Kawasaki Heavy Industries. 

Car E954-1 has a stream-line profile, reminiscent of the 500 series, and E954-8 has an arrow-line profile more reminiscent of the JR East E2 series and E4 series designs. 

The train was withdrawn in September 2009 and scrapped.

Formation
 E954-1 (T1c)
 E954-2 (M1) (with pantograph)
 E954-3 (M2) (with toilet)
 E954-4 (M2)
 E954-5 (M1s)
 E954-6 (M2)
 E954-7 (M1) (with pantograph)
 E954-8 (T2c)

Class E955 Fastech 360Z

This 6-car set (S10) was delivered on 6 April 2006. Cars 1 and 4 to 6 were built by Kawasaki Heavy Industries, and cars 2 and 3 were built by Hitachi The train was withdrawn in December 2008 and scrapped.

Formation
 E955-1 (M2c)
 E955-2 (M1s)
 E955-3 (M1) (with pantograph and toilet)
 E955-4 (M1)
 E955-5 (M1) (with pantograph)
 E955-6 (M2c)

References

External links

 Press release from JR East 
  A bullet train... only with ears (BBC News)
 JR East press release: "新幹線高速試験電車 FASTECH 360 まもなくデビュー" 
 新幹線高速試験電車E955形式 （FASTECH360Z）の概要 
 Class E954 "Fastech 360 S" (Japan Railfan Magazine Online) 
 Class E955 "Fastech 360 Z" (Japan Railfan Magazine Online) 

Shinkansen train series
East Japan Railway Company
Train-related introductions in 2005
Experimental and prototype high-speed trains
20 kV AC multiple units
25 kV AC multiple units
Hitachi multiple units
Kawasaki multiple units